Benjamin Mines (born May 13, 2000) is an American soccer player who currently plays for Miami FC in the USL Championship.

Youth soccer
Mines joined the New York Red Bulls Academy in 2015, playing for the U-16 side during the 2015-16 season. He also appeared for United Soccer League side New York Red Bulls II in 2016, signing on an amateur contract. He made his debut for New York Red Bulls II on August 19, 2016 coming on as a second-half substitute for Junior Flemmings in a 1-0 victory over Louisville City FC. Mines remained with Red Bulls II under an amateur contract during the 2017 season, making his season debut in a 3-3 draw against Pittsburgh Riverhounds. On May 20, 2017, Mines scored his first goal for the club in a 4-3 loss to Ottawa Fury FC. On October 22, 2017, Mines scored for New York in a 4-0 victory over Charleston Battery in the 2017 USL Playoffs.

Professional career
On January 8, 2018 it was announced that Mines had signed his first professional contract with New York Red Bulls. On March 10, 2018, he scored on his MLS debut in a 4-0 victory over Portland Timbers.

On March 15, 2018, the New York Red Bulls entered into a loan agreement with New York Red Bulls II, and Mines was listed on the Red Bulls II 2018 USL season roster. On March 31, 2018 Mines scored his first goal of the season for New York Red Bulls II in a 5-2 victory over Charleston Battery.

Mines was released by New York on November 30, 2020.

FC Cincinnati selected Ben Mines with the first selection of the 2020 End-of-Year Waivers Draft on December 16, 2020  On December 30, 2020, it was announced Mines and Cincinnati had agreed terms ahead of their 2021 season. On August 16, 2021, Mines was loaned to USL Championship side Orange County SC.

On March 9, 2022, Mines signed on a season-long loan with USL Championship side Colorado Springs Switchbacks.

Mines was released by Cincinnati following their 2022 season.

On December 29, 2022, it was announced that Mines had joined USL Championship side Miami FC on a multi-year deal from 2023 onward.

Career statistics

Honors
New York Red Bulls
MLS Supporters' Shield: 2018

Orange County SC
USL Cup: 2021

References

External links
 

 ussoccerda.com

2000 births
Living people
American soccer players
Association football forwards
Association football midfielders
FC Cincinnati players
Colorado Springs Switchbacks FC players
Homegrown Players (MLS)
Major League Soccer players
Miami FC players
New York Red Bulls players
New York Red Bulls II players
Orange County SC players
People from Ridgefield, Connecticut
Soccer players from Connecticut
Sportspeople from Fairfield County, Connecticut
USL Championship players